Keshabpur High School (H.S.)  is a co-educational institution with instruction given in Bengali. It is in Keshabpur village, block of Domjur, District of Haora, state of West Bengal, India. It was established in 1968 and is overseen by the Department of Education Management.

History
Keshabpur High School is the largest school in Keshabpur village, and is under the WBCHSE. Courses taught include: Science, Arts, and Commerce. The school has been located centrally in the village. Students come from the surrounding villages including: Keshabpur, Rudrapur, Wadipur , Rongpara, Khantora, Kolora and others. There were 737 students attending as per government records. The staff numbers 30 staff. At this location is the ‘West Primary School’. The current head teacher is Haradhan Kungar. Students with financial difficulties attend on scholarship. They are currently developing a science program including a new teaching staff and a laboratory. Government support was used to construct a fourth floor seminar hall. Facilities and services they have include: a parking lot and government supported mid-day meals.

See also
Keshabpur

References

External links
Keshabphur High School

High schools and secondary schools in West Bengal
Schools in Howrah district
Educational institutions established in 1968
1968 establishments in West Bengal